Moradabad Rural is one of the 403 Legislative Assembly constituencies of Uttar Pradesh state in India.

It is part of Moradabad district.

Members of Legislative Assembly
1957: Khamani Singh, Independent
1962: Riasat Husain, Praja Socialist Party
1967: Khamani Singh, Indian National Congress
1969: Riasat Husain, Praja Socialist Party
1974: Om Prakash, Independent
1977: Riasat Husain, Independent
1980: Riasat Husain, Independent
1985: Mohammad Rizwanul Haq, Lok Dal
1989: Mohammad Rizwanul Haq, Janata Dal
1991: Mohammad Rizwanul Haq, Janata Dal
1993: Suresh Pratap Singh, Bharatiya Janata Party
1996: Saulat Ali, Samajwadi Party
2002: Shameemul Haq, Indian National Congress
2007: Usmanul Haq, Samajwadi Party
2012: Shameemul Haq, Samajwadi Party

Election results

2022

2017

See also
 List of constituencies of the Uttar Pradesh Legislative Assembly
 Moradabad district

References

External links
 Official Site of Legislature in Uttar Pradesh
Uttar Pradesh Government website
UP Assembly
 

Assembly constituencies of Uttar Pradesh
Moradabad district